The New Zealand national cricket team toured Australia in the 1973-74 season and played 3 Test matches. Australia won the series 2-0 with one match drawn.

New Zealand team

 Bevan Congdon (captain)
 Glenn Turner (vice-captain)
 Gren Alabaster
 Bryan Andrews
 Lance Cairns
 Keith Campbell
 Jeremy Coney
 Dayle Hadlee
 Richard Hadlee
 Brian Hastings
 John Morrison
 David O'Sullivan
 John Parker
 Mike Shrimpton
 Ken Wadsworth

Coney joined the tour when Turner was injured. Andrews, Cairns, Coney and Morrison made their Test debuts on the tour. Alabaster and Campbell never played Test cricket.

Test series summary

First Test

Second Test

Third Test

Tour matches summary

Annual reviews
 Playfair Cricket Annual 1974
 Wisden Cricketers' Almanack 1975

References

Further reading
 Bill Frindall, The Wisden Book of Test Cricket 1877-1978, Wisden, 1979
 Chris Harte, A History of Australian Cricket, Andre Deutsch, 1993

External links
 New Zealand in Australia: Dec 1973/Jan 1974 at Cricinfo
 New Zealand to Australia 1973-74 at Test Cricket Tours
 New Zealand in Australia 1973-74 at CricketArchive

1973 in Australian cricket
1973 in New Zealand cricket
1973–74 Australian cricket season
1974 in Australian cricket
1974 in New Zealand cricket
International cricket competitions from 1970–71 to 1975
1973-74